Marie Henriette Steil (1898–1930) was a Luxembourg writer and feminist.
Born on 3 August 1898 in Luxembourg, she is known to have been keen to assert her independence as a woman and to have promoted feministic trends such as a boyish hairstyle. After publishing some short pieces in Les Cahiers luxembourgeois, she aspired to become a professional writer but died when she was only 32.

Her earliest works were published in Luxembourg newspapers. They included the story Der Mond und das Mädchen (The Moon and the Maiden) which she sent in to a contest organized by the Luxemburger Zeitung. Other newspapers she contributed to included Jonghémecht, Junge Welt and Tageblatt.  In Les Cahiers luxembourgeois she maintained a column Lettres de Suzette à Micromégas. She also wrote for the Berliner Lokalanzeiger and other German newspapers including Ullsteins Frauenblätter and Welt am Montag. In 1926, Steil completed a collection of short stories titled Tier und Mensch. Harmlose Geschichten (Animal and Man. Harmless Stories) which was published in Leipzig. In these allegorical tales, animals take on the roles of human beings while humans behave like animals.

Marie Henriette Steil died in Luxembourg City on 18 December 1930 when she was only 32.

In September 2005, the Luxembourg Post Office issued a stamp in her memory bearing the sketched portrait displayed here.

References

1898 births
1930 deaths
People from Luxembourg City
Luxembourgian writers
Luxembourgian women writers
Luxembourgian feminists
20th-century Luxembourgian writers
20th-century women writers